Eric William Barnum (born March 15, 1979) is an American composer of choral, instrumental, and vocal works. He received his doctorate in Choral Conducting at the University of Washington, Seattle. He is currently the Director of Choral Activities at Drake University in Des Moines, Iowa.

Career
Barnum studied composition and vocal performance at Bemidji State University, Minnesota, where he studied with Patrick Riley in 2002. He later studied composition and received his M.Mus. in choral conducting with David Dickau at Minnesota State University, Mankato in 2004.  Barnum received a DMA in Choral Conducting from the University of Washington under the direction of Geoffrey Boers in 2013.

Barnum has been commissioned by ACDA Honor choirs, university ensembles, professional choirs, and school choirs.  His composition of the poem "She Walks in Beauty" was incorporated in the male classical vocal ensemble Chanticleer's touring repertoire.

Musical style
Barnum's music is tied to preexisting text, most often from Latin liturgical sources or English poetry.

Awards 
 Chanticleer Student Composer Competition, for "She Walks in Beauty"
 2004-2005 Composer-in-Residence for The Rose Ensemble
 2004 JCCP Composers Grant (funded by the Jerome Foundation)

Compositions

Teaching
Barnum is Director of Choral Activities at Drake University in Des Moines, Iowa and was recently the Director of Choral Activities at the University of Wisconsin, Oshkosh.

References

*1Barnum, Dr. Eric. "Telling Stories." Convocation. University of Wisconsin Oshkosh. Arts and Communication Building, Oshkosh. 21 Mar. 2014. Class lecture.

External links
Artist's website
Eric William Barnum: TragicHero, University of Washington
http://www.uwosh.edu/music/faculty/barnum
https://ericwilliambarnum.wordpress.com

American male composers
21st-century American composers
1979 births
Living people
Choral compositions
Choral composers
21st-century American male musicians